Path of Most Resistance is a compilation album of music by Secret Chiefs 3, released in 2007 by Mimicry Records. The album features original compositions from Trey Spruance as well as covers of compositions by Ernest Gold, Ananda Shankar, RD Burman, Tommie Connor, Brian Wilson and Van Dyke Parks. The last three songs had not been released on any other Secret Chiefs 3 album.

2007 albums
Secret Chiefs 3 albums
Web of Mimicry albums
Albums produced by Trey Spruance